The Pan American Beach Handball Championship was the official competition for Men's and Women's national beach handball teams of America. In addition to crowning the Pan American champions, the tournament also served as a qualifying tournament for the Beach Handball World Championships. In 2018, the PATHF folded and the tournament was replaced with the North America & the Caribbean and South & Central American championships.

Men's

Summary

Medal table

Participating nations

Women's

Summary

Medal table

Participating nations

References

External links
 www.panamhandball.org

Pan-American Team Handball Federation competitions
Beach handball competitions
Recurring sporting events established in 2004
Recurring sporting events disestablished in 2018